Whitehall is a historic home located at Saluda, Saluda County, South Carolina.  It was built in about 1893, and is a Classical Revival style frame dwelling with a two-story, rectangular main block with additions.  Two façades feature tetrastyle, two-story porticos with Corinthian order columns.  Also on the property are 11 outbuildings. It has two sunken rice patties. It was the home of the locally prominent Etheredge family.

It was added to the National Register of Historic Places in 1980.

References

Houses on the National Register of Historic Places in South Carolina
Neoclassical architecture in South Carolina
Houses completed in 1893
Houses in Saluda County, South Carolina
National Register of Historic Places in Saluda County, South Carolina